Emma Mulvaney-Stanak is an American politician who serves in the Vermont House of Representatives from the Chittenden-6-2 district as a member of the Vermont Progressive Party. Prior to her tenure in the state house she served on the city council in Burlington, Vermont, and as chair of the Vermont Progressive Party.

Mulvaney-Stanak was educated at Smith College. She became involved in politics when she served as director of the Vermont Living Wage Campaign and as field director for Scudder Parker's gubernatorial campaign during the 2006 election.

She was elected to the Burlington city council from the 2nd district in 2009, but had to resign due to her moving. She won election to the city council from the 3rd district and at one point she was the only Progressive member of the city council. She was selected to serve as chair of the Progressive Party and served until 2017. She defeated incumbent Democratic Representative Jean O'Sullivan for the Democratic nomination for a seat in the state house and won in the 2020 election.

Early life and education

Emma Mulvaney-Stanak and her twin were born to Ed Stanak, who later ran for Vermont Attorney General with the Vermont Progressive Party's nomination in 2012, and Joelen Mulvaney. Mulvaney-Stanak graduated from Smith College with a degree in political science. She married Megan, with whom she has two children.

Career

Local and state politics

Mulvaney-Stanak served as director of the Vermont Living Wage Campaign. She worked as field director for Scudder Parker's gubernatorial campaign during the 2006 election.

Mulvaney-Stanak was elected to succeed Jane Knodell, a member of the Progressive Party, on the city council from the 2nd district in Burlington, Vermont, with the nomination of the Progressive Party against Democratic nominee Nicole Pelletier. However, she resigned from the city council on December 15, 2009, due to her moving from the 2nd district to the 3rd district which the city charter required her to resign for. Democratic nominee Bram Kranichfeld won election to the city council from the 2nd district in the 2010 election.

Clarence Davis, a member of the Progressive Party, did not seek reelection to the city council from the 3rd district in the 2010 election. Mulvaney-Stanak won in the 2010 election without opposition. She was the only Progressive member of the fourteen-member city council following the resignation of Marisa Caldwell in 2010, which was the lowest amount for the party since 1981. She did not seek reelection in the 2012 election. Rachel Siegel was elected to succeed her in the 2012 election.

Mulvaney-Stanak was selected to serve as secretary of the Vermont Progressive Party in April 2013. Martha Abbott did not seek reelection as chair of the Vermont Progressive Party. Mulvaney-Stanak was selected to serve as chair of the party on November 10, 2013, and was reelected in 2015. She resigned as chair on June 9, 2017, to focus on her job working for the Vermont-National Education Association and Anthony Pollina was selected to serve as interim chair.

Vermont House of Representatives

Mulvaney-Stanak ran for the Progressive and Democratic nomination for a seat in the Vermont House of Representatives from the Chittenden-6-2 district during the 2020 election. She defeated incumbent Democratic Representative Jean O'Sullivan in the Democratic primary and won in the general election without opposition. During the primary O'Sullivan claimed that Mulvaney-Stanak wasn't a real Democrat.

In 2020, she was selected by a unanimous vote of seven to serve as assistant chair of the Vermont Progressive Party's caucus in the state house.

Electoral history

References

21st-century American politicians
21st-century American women politicians
Living people
Democratic Party members of the Vermont House of Representatives
Smith College alumni
Vermont Progressive Party politicians
Women state legislators in Vermont
Year of birth missing (living people)
LGBT state legislators in Vermont